Ivan Kisel (born 28 May 1998) is a Belarusian professional footballer who plays BGU Minsk.

References

External links 
 
 

1998 births
Living people
Belarusian footballers
Association football defenders
FC BATE Borisov players
FC Energetik-BGU Minsk players
FC Smorgon players
FC Sputnik Rechitsa players
FC Shakhtyor Petrikov players